The Kranji State Cemetery is a national cemetery of Singapore. This cemetery is located at Kranji near Kranji War Cemetery.

War graves sections are maintained by the Commonwealth War Graves Commission.

Notable burials
Former Presidents of Singapore are buried in the state cemetery.

See also
 Death in Singapore
 Former cemeteries in Singapore
 Mandai Crematorium and Columbarium – resting place of ordinary Singaporeans as well as several presidents, senior cabinet ministers, as well as former Prime Minister Lee Kuan Yew and his wife Kwa Geok Choo

References

Cemeteries in Singapore